Yeshivas Etz Ḥayyim, commonly called the Volozhin Yeshiva, was a prestigious Lithuanian yeshiva located in the town of Volozhin, Russian Empire (now Valozhyn, Belarus). It was founded around 1803 by Rabbi Ḥayyim Volozhiner, a student of the famed Vilna Gaon, and trained several generations of scholars, rabbis, and leaders. It is considered the first modern yeshiva, and served as a model for later Misnagedic educational institutions.

The institution reached its zenith under the leadership of Rabbi Naftali Zvi Yehuda Berlin, who became rosh yeshiva in 1854. In 1892, demands of the Russian authorities to increase secular studies forced the yeshiva to close. It re-opened on a smaller scale in 1899 and functioned until the outbreak of World War II in 1939. During the War German soldiers used the building as a stable, and it was subsequently converted into a canteen and deli. The site was returned to the Jewish community of Belarus in 1989. It is considered a cultural and architectural landmark, and in 1998, the Volozhin Yeshiva was registered on the State List of Historical and Cultural Monuments of the Republic of Belarus.

History
 
The Volozhin Yeshiva was founded around 1803 by Rabbi Ḥayyim Volozhiner. After his death in 1821, he was succeeded as head of the yeshiva by his son, Isaac. When Isaac died in 1849, Rabbi Eliezer Fried was appointed head of the yeshiva, with Rabbi Naftali Zvi Yehuda Berlin as his assistant. 

Rabbi Fried died soon after, in 1854, whereupon Rabbi Berlin became the new head along with Rabbi Yosef Dov Soloveitchik, Rabbi Ḥayyim Volozhiner's great-grandson who was the assistant rosh yeshiva. In 1865, Soloveichik left to become a rabbi in Slutsk. The Volozhin yeshiva closed in 1892, because of the Russian government's demand for a dramatic increase in the amount of time spent teaching certain secular studies.

According to some, the pressure from the Russian government was due to the Maskilim accusing the yeshiva of being subversive. 

The biography of R. Ḥayyim Soleveitchik states there were secular studies taught for a short period some nights that were barely attended. However these were concessions legally mandated that the rosh hayeshivas felt were necessary rather than shut down the yeshiva. When the government imposed extreme guidelines Rabbi Berlin refused to comply and allowed the government to close the yeshiva.  
"All teachers of all subjects must have college diplomas ... no Judaic subjects may be taught between 9 AM and 3 PM ... no night classes are allowed ... total hours of study per day may not exceed ten."

Historian Shaul Stampfer and others maintain that the root of the problem was Rabbi Berlin's attempt to install his son as Rosh Yeshiva in the face of opposition. Russian government documents that have recently come to light seem to indicate that this was a consideration in the yeshiva's closure. 

Rabbi Refael Shapiro, the son-in-law of Rabbi Naftali Zvi Yehuda Berlin, reopened the yeshiva in 1899, albeit on a smaller scale. It remained open until World War II, and was re-established, also on a small scale, in Israel after the war.
From 1886 through 1991, alumni of this yeshiva and their descendants ran a synagogue on the Lower East Side of Manhattan, New York that carried the name of this yeshiva.

Threat of repossession
In 2000, the Valozhyn authorities returned the building to the Jewish Religious Union of Belarus, an Orthodox Jewish umbrella organization. In 2007, the government of Belarus threatened to repossess the building unless the community raised $20,000 in order to renovate it. The Jewish community in America took action and Agudath Israel raised money to restore the site. The yeshiva building is presently undergoing restoration through the partnership of Yad Yisroel and the Union of Religious Congregations of the Republic of Belarus.

Gallery

Notable alumni

See also
 Vilna Rabbinical School and Teachers' Seminary

References

Bibliography

External links

Student portraits
Photo of Volozhin yeshiva on the site Globe of Belarus (in Russian)
City Portal of Volozhin
Yad Yisroel Yeshiva Volozhin Renovation
Volozhin Yeshiva in the Bezalel Narkiss Index of Jewish Art, Center for Jewish Art, Hebrew University of Jerusalem

Belarus articles missing geocoordinate data
Educational institutions established in 1803
Jewish Belarusian history
Jews and Judaism in the Russian Empire
Orthodox Judaism in Belarus
Valozhyn District
Yeshivas of Belarus